The Gujari Mahal Archeological Museum or State Archaeological Museum, sometimes called the "Gwalior Fort Museum", is a state museum in Gwalior, located in the fortress of Gujari Mahal. It displays numerous artifacts of the region, including a fragment of the Garuda capital of the Heliodorus pillar from Vidisha.

The palace of Gujari Mahal
was built by Tomar Rajput ruler Man Singh Tomar for his wife Mrignayani who belonged to Gujjar tribe. She demanded a separate palace for herself with a regular water supply through an aqueduct from the nearby Rai River. The palace has been converted into an archaeological museum. Rare artifacts at the museum include Hindu and Jain sculptures dated to the 1st and 2nd centuries BCE, miniature statue of Salabhanjika, terracotta items and replicas of frescoes seen in the Bagh Caves.

References

Museums in Madhya Pradesh
Buildings and structures in Gwalior
Education in Gwalior
Archaeological museums in India
Tourist attractions in Gwalior
Rajput architecture